Abdullah Al-Ghamdi (born 27 August 1997) is a Saudi Arabian professional footballer who plays for Muhayil as a winger.

Career statistics

Club

References

External links 
 

1997 births
Living people
Saudi Arabian footballers
Muhayil Club players
Damac FC players
Al-Mujazzal Club players
Al-Hejaz Club players
Saudi Fourth Division players
Saudi Professional League players
Saudi First Division League players
Saudi Second Division players
Saudi Third Division players
Association football wingers